Multi-Academy Trust (MAT) or school trust is an academy trust that operates more than one academy school. Academy schools are state-funded schools in England which are directly funded by the Department for Education and independent of local authority control. The terms of the arrangements are set out in individual Academy Funding Agreements. The group of schools in a multi-academy trust work together to advance education for public benefit.

The Department for Education's document, Open academies, free schools, studio schools, UTCs and academy projects in development, states that as of November 2022, there are 10,146 academies in England, within 2,456 academy trusts, of which 1,190 consist of at least two schools. 80% of secondary schools, 39% of primary schools and 43% of special schools are already academies (as of January 2022). This growth in the academies system coincides with the improvement of Ofsted judgement across schools, with 88% of all schools rated Good or Outstanding, an improvement from 68% in August 2010.

History
The Education Act 1944 established a national system of primary and secondary education, with schools under the overall supervision of ‘local education authorities’ who were responsible for funding all such schools. Then, with the Education (No. 2) Act 1986 and the  Education Reform Act 1988 schools gained local management through governing bodies, which were able to act on key decisions such as finance and appointments rather than that all being under the local authority, as had been the position before.

Sponsored academies were then introduced from the early 2000s by the Labour government. The sponsor paid the capital cost and the revenue costs were paid by central government. A sponsor set up a charitable trust and individual contracts were signed with the Department for Education (DfE). These were all secondary schools that had failed in the Ofsted criteria. By 2010 there were 203 such schools, out of a total 3,333 secondary schools.

The Academies Act 2010 was passed by the incoming Conservative Government, providing a bespoke statutory mechanism for maintained schools, both primary and secondary, to be forced or allowed to ‘convert’ to academy status. The DfE adopted various ‘model funding agreements’ for new academies. New academies called ‘free schools’ could be built.  A local authority needing to build a new school in its area had to seek proposals to establish an academy, in the form of a ‘free school’. They were no longer allowed to construct it themselves.

In 2014, eight Regional Schools Commissioners (RSCs) were appointed as DfE civil servants. With the responsibility for approving new academies and intervening to address performance issues in academies. They have significant powers to influence both academies and local authority maintained schools. In 2022, their titles were changed to Regional Directors (RDs) operating across nine individual regions.

Governance
Academy Trusts are education charities that are set up for the purpose of running and improving schools. Academy Trusts are governed by a Board of Trustees, which has strict duties under charity law and company law. Academies are inspected and follow the same rules on admissions, special educational needs and exclusions as other state schools and students sit the same national exams. Multi-Academy Trusts consist of more than one school.

An academy is a state school governed by a Board of Trustees through a Funding Agreement it makes with the Department of Education, and at that point it is no longer maintained by the local authority. The current advisory text is the Academy and free school: master funding agreement dated December 2020. The trustees of the academy trust are obliged to publish an annual report and accounts, a required accountability and transparency measure which does not apply to maintained schools.

All academies are expected to follow a broad and balanced curriculum, but some may have a particular focus on, or formal specialism in, one or more areas such as science; arts; business and enterprise; computing; engineering; mathematics; modern foreign languages; performing arts; sport; or technology. 

Like other state schools, academies are required to adhere to the School Admissions Code, although newly established academies with a faith designation are subject to the 50% Rule requiring them to allocate at least half of their places without reference to faith. In terms of their governance, academies are established as companies limited by guarantee and have exempt charity status, accountable to the Department for Education, the Education and Skills Funding Agency and Ofsted. The Board of Trustees are Company Directors and Charity Trustees and are legally accountable for the operation of the academy trust. The Trust serves as the legal entity of which the school is part. The trustees oversee the strategic direction of the trust, sometimes delegating responsibility for individual schools to a local governing body or local academy council, which they appoint. The overall management of the trust may be conducted by a CEO, whilst the day-to-day management of each individual school is, as in most schools, conducted by the head teacher and their senior leadership team.

Operators
Examples of some of the larger multi-academy trusts include ARK Schools, Academies Enterprise Trust, E-ACT (formerly Edutrust Academies Charitable Trust), Harris Federation, Oasis Trust, Ormiston Academies Trust, Star Academies and United Learning Trust.

The Department of Education publishes a full list of active academy sponsors.

School improvement
Sector experts such as Leora Cruddas, Chief Executive of the sector body Confederation of School Trusts, support the concept of academy trusts being the ideal vehicle for school improvement, as, unlike in local authorities, “it is the legal vehicle that enables schools to work together in a group in a single legal entity. The trust, therefore, creates the capacity for school improvement. As the legal entity, the trust can also create the conditions and the culture of improvement.” They also highlight the impact academy trusts have made in tackling the attainment gap in areas of the country such as the North.

References

External links
Research gate selected papers

 
Secondary education in England
School types
Secondary schools in England
Education policy in the United Kingdom
Public education in the United Kingdom
Public finance of England
State schools in the United Kingdom
United Kingdom educational programs